This is a list of canneries. A cannery is involved in the processes of canning, a method of preserving food in which the food contents are processed and sealed in an airtight container.

Canneries

United States
 Bush Brothers Cannery - Chestnut Hill, Tennessee
 Calpak Plant No. 11 – located in Sacramento, California, it was constructed as a fruit cannery, and is used by Blue Diamond Almonds
 Edgett-Burnham Canning Company - former cannery in Camden, New York
Empson Cannery, Longmont, Colorado, NRHP-listed
 Hovden Cannery - Monterey, California
 Kake Cannery - Kake, Alaska, listed on the National Register of Historic Places (NRHP)
 Kirkland Cannery Building - former cannery in Kirkland, Washington
 Kukak Bay Cannery - former cannery in Alaska
 Libby, McNeill and Libby Cannery - former cannery in Sacramento, California, NRHP-listed
 Libby, McNeill and Libby Building - former cannery and processing plant in Blue Island, Illinois
 Marshall J. Kinney Cannery - former cannery in Astoria, Oregon
 Samuel Elmore Cannery – was a U.S. National Historic Landmark in Astoria, Oregon that was designated in 1966 but was delisted in 1993. It was the home of "Bumble Bee" brand tuna.
 Wards Cove Packing Company - former cannery in Ketchikan, Alaska
 W.R. Roach Cannery - former cannery in Crosswell, Michigan, NRHP-listed

Kukak Cannery Archeological Historic District, Kukak Bay, Alaska, NRHP-listed
Thomas and Company Cannery, Gaithersburg, Maryland, NRHP-listed
Thompson Fish House, Turtle Cannery and Kraals, Key West, Florida, NRHP-listed
Libby, McNeill and Libby Cannery Gridley, California USA (Peaches/Pumpkins)

British Columbia

By type
 List of salmon canneries and communities

See also
 Canned fish
 Canned water
 Food industry
 Salmon cannery

References